Gary Carr (born 11 December 1986) is an English actor, dancer, singer, and musician known for his works on screen and stage. He has had main character roles in BBC TV series Death in Paradise and US TV series The Deuce. He is also known for playing an American jazz singer named Jack Ross in the ITV historical drama Downton Abbey.

Education 
Carr began training at the National Youth Music Theatre of Great Britain, then trained at the Arts Educational Schools from 2003 through 2005, and then at the London Academy of Music and Dramatic Art from 2005 to 2008 with a scholarship from the Leverhulme Trust.

Career 
Since graduating from LAMDA in July 2008, he has appeared in television productions for BBC and ITV, and in the Royal National Theatre production of Dido, Queen of Carthage, written by Christopher Marlowe and directed by James MacDonald.

He has had main character roles on television in BBC TV series Death in Paradise, playing police officer Fidel Best from 2011 to 2014. He played charismatic pimp C. C. in the US TV series The Deuce in 2017 and 2018 series with guest appearances in the third and last series in 2019. He is also known for playing American jazz singer Jack Ross in the ITV historical drama Downton Abbey in Series 4, which aired in 2013.

His theatrical work includes Yerma and Macbeth. In November 2009, he played the lead role in the Royal National Theatre stage production of the Terry Pratchett novel Nation, adapted by Mark Ravenhill and directed by Melly Still. He appeared in the Amazon Prime Video series The Peripheral.

Personal life 
Carr's brother, Daniel, is a professional footballer who has played international football for Trinidad and Tobago.

Filmography

Film

Television

Video games

Awards 
 National Operatic and Dramatic Association Junior Award
 LAMDA Fight Night Competition Winner 2006
 Leverhulme Trust Bursary, Scholarship
 John Collins Millennium Cup for Drama

References

External links 
 

English male stage actors
English male film actors
English male television actors
English male voice actors
Alumni of the London Academy of Music and Dramatic Art
1986 births
Living people
21st-century English male actors
21st-century English musicians
English people of Nigerian descent
Black British male actors
English people of Yoruba descent
People educated at the Arts Educational Schools
Yoruba male actors
Male actors from London